The A4 highway is a highway in Lithuania (Magistralinis kelias). It runs from Vilnius to the Belarus border, near Druskininkai. The length of the road is 134.46 km.

Most of the road has one lane per each direction and default 90 km/h speed limit. It is the main road connecting Vilnius with the Dzūkija region.

Roads in Lithuania